Richard M. Lerner (born February 23, 1946) is professor of Human Development at Tufts University, occupying the Bergstrom Chair in Applied Developmental Science. Also at Tufts, he directs the Institute for Applied Research in Youth Development.

Lerner has authored more than 700 scholarly publications, including more than 80 authored or edited books, and was founding editor of the Journal of Research on Adolescence and of Applied Developmental Science, the latter of which he continues to edit.

Lerner's recent honors include: American Psychological Association (Division 1) Ernest R. Hilgard Lifetime Achievement Award for Distinguished Career Contributions to General Psychology, 2015American Psychological Association Gold Medal for Life Achievement in the Application of Psychology, 2014American Psychological Associations (Division 7) Urie Bronfenbrenner Award for Lifetime Contribution to Developmental Psychology in the Service of Science and Society, 2013John P. Hill Memorial Award for Life-Time Outstanding Work, the Society for Research on Adolescence, 2010

Selected works 
 Lerner, Richard M. Concepts and Theories of Human Development. 3rd ed. Mahwah, NJ: Erlbaum, 2002.
 Silbereisen, R. K. and Richard M. Lerner (eds.). Approaches to Positive Youth Development. Los Angeles: Sage, 2007.
 Damon, William and Richard M. Lerner. Child and Adolescent Development: An Advanced Course. Hoboken, NJ: Wiley, 2008.
 
 
 
 Molenaar, Peter C. M., Richard M. Lerner, and Karl M. Newell (eds.). Handbook of Developmental Systems Theory and Methodology. Guilford, 2014.
 Lerner, Richard M. and Willis F. Overton (eds.). Handbook of Child Psychology and Developmental Science. 4 vols. Hoboken, NJ: Wiley, 2015.

References

Educational psychologists
Living people
Tufts University faculty
Hunter College alumni
Graduate Center, CUNY alumni
1946 births
Developmental psychologists
Academic journal editors
People from Brooklyn
American educational psychologists